Aristóbulo Cala Cala (born 13 May 1990 in Hato, Santander) is a Colombian cyclist riding for .

Career
Cala rode the first bicycle at his 14 years old, it was borrow from his cousin because he did not have its own bike. Aristobulo come from a farmer family with limited resources but his love by the bike took him to save for his first bike and started to be present at local stages when he was 18 years old.  He always was in the podium even when he did not know the riding techniques, his outstanding results and performance specially in the high hills called the attention from more experienced riders and sponsors saying he was born for cycling, he has the cycling in his genes.  Therefore he was taken to Boyacá at 20 years old, to be trained at 2,600 m above sea level and participated in his first national games where he was 3rd in sub-23 category.  From there he is always a great protagonist in each presentation, specially in those stages with high mountains where is very hard for others, he is feeling like at home, a pure climber.  His major achievement is the overall winner in La Vuelta Colombia 2017 and recently 8th in Colombia Oro y Paz competition where he was at  level of world-tour figures.  Aristobulo demonstrated that his body respond favorable with more days in the competitions making him ideal for 2 or 3 weeks competitions.

Major results
2017
 1st  Overall Vuelta a Colombia
2018 
 1st Stage 10 Vuelta a Costa Rica
 8th Overall Colombia Oro y Paz
2019
 4th Road race, National Road Championships
2021
 1st  Road race, National Road Championships
 3rd Overall Vuelta a Colombia

References

1990 births
Living people
Colombian male cyclists
Sportspeople from Santander Department